"We've Got a Big Mess on Our Hands" is the first single by The Academy Is... from their 2007 album Santi. The song impacted radio on March 13, 2007.

Music video
The music video directed by Alan Ferguson focuses on William Beckett, beginning with a second more violent and unpleasant version of him leaving his apartment. The real William Beckett then follows, as his alter ego causes havoc. The final scene shows Beckett rushing onstage as the band is playing, and continually pummels his doppelganger. It then cuts to a show that there is no audience and no one is on stage except Beckett, implying that he hallucinated the entire incident, or that it was all a dream. The video directly crosses with Fall Out Boy's video single "Thnks fr th Mmrs", showing William Beckett on the phone with Pete Wentz; however, Wentz is having his makeup done at the time by one of the video's chimpanzees. "We've Got a Big Mess on Our Hands" has also been briefly featured on the second episode of the comedy series Aliens in America on The CW and also on Newport Harbor: The Real Orange County.

Track listing
 "We've Got a Big Mess on Our Hands" – 3:26

References

The Academy Is... songs
2007 singles
2007 songs
Fueled by Ramen singles
Song recordings produced by Butch Walker
Songs written by Mike Carden
Songs written by William Beckett (singer)

Music videos directed by Alan Ferguson (director)